Pseudohydnum is a genus of fungi in the order  Auriculariales. Basidiocarps (fruit bodies) are typically bracket-like and gelatinous, with or without a stipe, with a hydnoid (toothed) undersurface. The genus is widely distributed in both the northern and southern hemisphere, with some seven species currently described and others awaiting description.

Taxonomy    
The genus, first described by Finnish mycologist Petter Adolf Karsten in 1868, has not yet been classified with certainty into a family. Molecular research, based on cladistic analysis of DNA sequences, has confirmed Pseudohydnum as a natural (monophyletic) taxon.

References

External links

Auriculariales
Fungi described in 1868
Taxa named by Petter Adolf Karsten